Another World is an album by saxophonist Stan Getz which was recorded in 1977 and originally released on the Columbia label as a double LP.

Reception

The Allmusic review by Scott Yanow stated "the music heard throughout this set is generally quite rewarding. The musicianship is high and Stan Getz was open to new challenges".

Track listing
 "Pretty City" (Andy LaVerne) - 10:25
 "Keep Dreaming" (LaVerne) - 7:49
 "Sabra" (LaVerne) - 9:34
 "Anna" (Mike Richmond) - 3:06
 "Another World" (Stan Getz) - 6:10
 "Sum Sum" (Richmond) - 7:06
 "Willow Weep for Me" (Ann Ronell) - 11:21
 "Blue Serge" (Mercer Ellington) - 3:38 	
 "Brave Little Pernille" (Richmond) - 7:15
 "Club 7 and Other Wild Places" (Richmond) - 9:02

Personnel 
Stan Getz - tenor saxophone
Andy LaVerne - piano, electric piano, ARP String Ensemble, minimoog, harpsichord
Mike Richmond - bass, electric bass
Billy Hart - drums
Efrain Toro - percussion

References 

1978 albums
Stan Getz albums
Columbia Records albums